Mysterious Skin is a 2004 coming-of-age film written and directed by Gregg Araki, adapted from Scott Heim's 1995 novel of the same name. The film tells the story of two pre-adolescent boys who both experienced sexual abuse as children, and how it affects their lives in different ways into their young adulthood. One boy becomes a reckless, sexually adventurous prostitute (played by Joseph Gordon-Levitt), while the other (Brady Corbet) retreats into a reclusive fantasy of alien abduction.

Mysterious Skin premiered at the 61st Venice International Film Festival in September 2004, although it was not more widely distributed until May 2005 without a rating. It grossed $2.1 million at the box office and received critical acclaim. Psychologists have praised Mysterious Skin for its accurate depiction of the long-term effects of child sex abuse.

Plot
Two eight-year-old Little League teammates, Neil McCormick and Brian Lackey, both experience life-altering events during the summer of 1981 in Hutchinson, Kansas. Neil, the son of an irresponsible single mother and already discovering his own homosexuality, is sexually abused by the Little League coach, who leaves town after that summer. Brian, whose parents are often neglectful or busy working, only remembers that it started to rain during a game. The next thing he remembers is being in the crawl space of his house with a bloody nose, having no memory of the intervening five hours.

Neil views the coach's abuse as love, and develops an attraction to older men. He begins working as a hustler at the age of 15, and continues doing so three years later when he moves to New York City, where his best friend, Wendy Peterson, now lives. In New York, Neil has an emotional encounter with a client, Zeke, who is dying from AIDS and (instead of sex) only wants to feel another person's touch. Afterward, Neil begins withdrawing from sex work and takes a job at a sandwich shop with assistance and encouragement from Wendy.

Brian suffers from chronic nosebleeds, blackouts, and bedwetting for years after coming to in the crawl space. He also has recurring dreams about being touched by a strange, bluish hand, which eventually lead Brian to suspect he may have been abducted by aliens. Another boy wearing the same Little League uniform begins to appear in these dreams later on. At 18, Brian meets a woman named Avalyn Friesen, who also believes she was abducted by aliens. They start to form a friendship, but when she makes sexual advances toward him, he panics and refuses to speak to her again.

Brian sees a photo of his Little League team as he tries to untangle his confused memories, recognizing a young Neil as the other boy from his dreams. Meanwhile, after a client brutally rapes and beats him, Neil returns to Hutchinson to spend Christmas with his mother. There, Neil and Brian meet for the first time in over a decade. After breaking into the house that was previously rented by the Little League coach, Neil tells Brian what happened that night: the coach offered to drive Brian home with Neil after a baseball game was rained out, as Brian did not have a ride. Instead, they all went to the coach's house, where the coach performed sex acts on the boys and made them perform sex acts on each other. At one point, Brian collapsed face-first onto the floor, giving him a bloody nose, while a porch light caused the atmosphere to have an eerie blue color. Having finally learned the truth, Brian breaks down crying and is comforted by Neil as Christmas carolers sing “Silent Night".

Cast
 Joseph Gordon-Levitt as Neil McCormick
 Chase Ellison as young Neil McCormick
 Brady Corbet as Brian Lackey 
 George Webster as young Brian Lackey  
 Michelle Trachtenberg as Wendy 
 Riley McGuire as young Wendy
 Jeff Licon as Eric Preston
 Mary Lynn Rajskub as Avalyn Friesen
 Elisabeth Shue as Ellen McCormick
 Bill Sage as Coach
 Chris Mulkey and Lisa Long as Mr. and Mrs. Lackey
 Richard Riehle as Charlie
 Kelly Kruger as Deborah
 Rachael Nastassja Kraft as young Deborah
 Billy Drago as Zeke

Production
Both Joseph Gordon-Levitt and Michelle Trachtenberg, by the time the film went into production, were looking for independent films where making money was not the main goal. Trachtenberg was filming EuroTrip (2004) in Prague when she first received the script, and quickly decided to join production. Gordon-Levitt was especially praiseful of Araki for allowing him to join production, and commented in a 2005 interview: "It is a really different role for me, and I'll always be really grateful to Gregg for believing that I could do a role like this. I've played the nice kid, and the smart one or funny one and even the angry one, but Gregg was the first one to call me sexy, and I'll always be really grateful for that." Araki approached Gordon-Levitt, who was by then struggling to find work for over a year, after seeing him in Manic (2001). Made on a low budget, filming commenced in August 2003 and lasted only three weeks, which gave the cast and crew no possibility of doing retakes.

A number of measures were taken to avoid exposing the child actors to the sexual and abusive aspects of the story. Although their parents were given the entire shooting script to review, the boys were given separate scripts which included only the activities they would be performing, and their roles and the characters' relationships were explained to them in innocent terms. All of the sexual abuse involving children is implied rather than being directly depicted, and the scenes in which this seduction and abuse takes place were filmed with each actor performing alone and addressing the camera rather than the other actor, then edited together, so the children did not see or hear the performance by the adult actor playing the abuser.

Reception
Mysterious Skin received an 86% "Certified Fresh" rating on review aggregator Rotten Tomatoes based on 109 reviews with an average rating of 7.40/10. The site's consensus states: "Bold performances and sensitive, spot-on direction make watching this difficult tale of trauma and abuse a thought-provoking, resonant experience." On Metacritic, which uses a weighted average, the film has a score of 73 out of 100 based on 32 reviews.

Lou Lumenick from the New York Post commented, "Not for the squeamish, but it is a beautifully crafted and thoughtful film that genuinely provokes."  Ella Taylor from LA Weekly wrote “A warped, but beautiful and strangely hopeful, coming-of-age tale.” Roger Ebert gave Mysterious Skin 3.5 out of a possible 4 stars, describing it as "at once the most harrowing and, strangely, the most touching film I have seen about child abuse." Steven Rhea of The Philadelphia Inquirer awarded the film 3 out of 4 stars, stating that Mysterious Skin ultimately "manages to deal with its raw, awful subject matter in ways that are both challenging and illuminating." Gordon-Levitt was praised by critics for his performance, and the actor has stated that people on the streets had come up to him to applaud his performance in the film. His portrayal of a teenage hustler inspired director Scott Frank to cast him in The Lookout (2007).

According to psychologist Richard Gartner, the novel Mysterious Skin is an uncommonly accurate portrayal of the long-term effect of child sexual abuse on boys.

Rating issues

The US MPAA rated the film NC-17, which the studio appealed unsuccessfully.  The film was released theatrically in the US without a rating.

Mysterious Skin was the subject of some controversy in Australia, where the Australian Family Association requested a review of its classification, seeking to have the film outlawed due to its depiction of pedophilia. They suggested that the film could be used by pedophiles for sexual gratification or to help them groom children for sexual abuse. The six-member Classification Review Board voted four-to-two in favour of maintaining an R18+ rating. The controversy is referenced in a review excerpt from The Sydney Morning Herald on the Region 4 DVD that reads: "How anyone could have wanted it banned is beyond me"; film critic Margaret Pomeranz expressed that the film does more for the case against pedophilia, stating: "People who do indulge in crimes like that, if they saw this film they would understand the damage that they do."

Soundtrack

The film score was composed by Harold Budd and Robin Guthrie.

Other songs include:
 "Golden Hair" – Slowdive (written by Syd Barrett)
 "Galaxy" – Curve
 "Game Show" – Dag Gabrielsen, Bill Campbell, Nelson Foltz, Robert Roe
 "Catch the Breeze" – Slowdive
 "Crushed" – Cocteau Twins
 "Dagger" – Slowdive
 "I Guess I Fell in Love Last Night" – Dag Gabrielsen, Alex Lacamoire
 "I Could Do Without Her" – Dag Gabrielsen, Alex Lacamoire
 "Drive Blind" – Ride
 "O Come All Ye Faithful" – Tom Meredith, Cydney Neal, Arlo Levin, Isaiah Teofilo
 "Away in a Manger" – Tom Meredith, Cydney Neal, Arlo Levin, Isaiah Teofilo
 "Silent Night" – Tom Meredith, Cydney Neal, Arlo Levin, Isaiah Teofilo, Evan Rachel Wood, John Mason
 "Samskeyti" – Sigur Rós
 "Blue Skied an' Clear" – Slowdive

Awards
 2004 Bergen International Film Festival – Jury Award
 2006 Polished Apple Awards – Best Movie
 2006 Icelandic Queer Film Festival – Best Fictional Work

References

External links

 
 
 
 
 
 Mysterious Skin script
 Interview with Gregg Araki about Mysterious Skin in Ion magazine

2004 films
2004 drama films
2004 independent films
2004 LGBT-related films
2000s coming-of-age drama films
2000s teen drama films
American coming-of-age drama films
American independent films
American teen drama films
American teen LGBT-related films
Dutch coming-of-age films
Dutch drama films
Dutch independent films
Dutch LGBT-related films
Dutch teen films
2000s English-language films
Films about post-traumatic stress disorder
Films about child sexual abuse
Films about nightmares
Films about male prostitution in the United States
Films based on American novels
Films directed by Gregg Araki
Films set in the 1970s
Films set in the 1980s
Films set in the 1990s
Films set in Kansas
Films set in New York City
Films shot in Los Angeles
Films shot in New York City
Gay-related films
LGBT-related coming-of-age films
LGBT-related drama films
LGBT-related controversies in film
Obscenity controversies in film
2000s American films